Season sixteen of the television program American Experience originally aired on the PBS network in the United States on September 8, 2003 and concluded on May 3, 2004.  The season contained nine new episodes and began with the eighth and final part of the miniseries New York: A Documentary Film, "The Center of the World".

Episodes

References

2003 American television seasons
2004 American television seasons
American Experience